Mattia Benedetti was an Italian painter. He was born in Reggio Emilia, and a pupil of Orazio Talami. He active as a fresco painter, active in painting quadratura. He painted the ceiling (1701) of the church of Sant' Antonio at Brescia. In Reggio-Emilia he painted the ceiling of the Capella maggiore of the Monache Bianchi, and the ceiling of the Oratory of the San Filippo Neri. His brother Ludovico or Lodovico was known for painting chiaroscuro and also perspective. Lodovico painted in the church of San Spiridone in Reggio-Emilia, as well as other churches.

Sources

People from Reggio Emilia
18th-century Italian painters
Italian male painters
Italian Baroque painters
Fresco painters
Quadratura painters
Painters from Modena
18th-century Italian male artists